The Buhlbachsee is a tarn (lake) in the northern Black Forest on the southwestern edge of the parish of Baiersbronn in the county of Freudenstadt in Baden-Württemberg. Since 1 January 2014 it has been part of the Black Forest National Park.

The tarn lies around 4.5 kilometres southeast of the summit of the Schliffkopf in the Buhlbach valley and less than half a kilometre northeast of the Black Forest High Road. The lake can be reached on foot over various paths including from Kniebis, Baiersbronn-Obertal or from the Black Forest High Road.

The tarn is about 160 metres wide and almost circular in shape. Only in the northeast, where the Buhlbach stream, which enters from the southwest, leaves the lake again is there a "nose" that gives it a length of about 200 metres. There is an island in the lake, about 0.7 hectares in area, which is covered in birch trees.

Like all tarns the Buhlbachsee was formed by a glacier. After the last ice age, which ended in the Black Forest about 10,000 years ago, it was left behind.

References

External links 
 The Buhlbachsee at www.schwarzwaldhochstrasse.de

Freudenstadt (district)
Lakes of Baden-Württemberg
Tarns of the Black Forest
LBuhlbachsee